Air cell or aircel may refer to:

 Air cell, a prechamber in an Indirect injection internal combustion engine
 An electrochemical cell that uses air as a terminal, such as the metal-air electrochemical cell
 Using cell phones on aircraft; see mobile phones on aircraft
Mastoid cells, also known as mastoid air cells or air cells, spaces in a bone behind the ear that contain air
 Aircell, a private company developing broadband for both private and commercial aviation
 Aircel group, an Indian mobile network operator
 Aircel Comics, a Canadian comic book publisher